is a mountain located on the northernmost edge of the Akaishi Mountains (also known as the Southern Alps), in Nagano Prefecture, Japan.

Outline 
Though part of the “Southern Alps”, Mount Nyukasa is not included in the Minami Alps National Park. There are multiple mountain climbing trails, and the summit offers a view of Mount Fuji.

The Japan Aerospace Exploration Agency has an observatory near the peak of Mount Nyukasa.

References 

Akaishi Mountains
Japan Alps
Mountains of Nagano Prefecture